The Râul Mic (in its upper course also: Valea Comenzii) is a left tributary of the river Cibin in Romania. Its source is in the Cindrel Mountains. It discharges into the Gura Râului Reservoir, which is drained by the Cibin.

References

Rivers of Romania
Rivers of Sibiu County